A77 or A-77 may refer to:

Roads
 A77 motorway (France)
 A77 motorway (Netherlands)
 A77 road (Scotland)
 Autovía A-77, a Spanish motorway
 Studer-Revox A77, a 1967 model of audio tape recorder manufactured by the Studer company under the Revox tradename 

Other
 Sony Alpha 77, camera made by Sony
 Teriflunomide (A77 1726), the active metabolite of leflunomide
 Benoni Defense in the Encyclopaedia of Chess Openings